The Pakistan Bodybuilding Federation (PBBF) is responsible for the promotion and growth of the game of bodybuilding in Pakistan.

History 
The PBBF organized its first event, titled Mr. Lahore (later renamed to Mr. Punjab) in 1952. Another competition, Mr. Pakistan, was held in Lahore in the same year. December of 1953 saw bodybuilders from various cities including Dhaka, Karachi, Lahore, Quetta, Rawalpindi, and Sialkot compete in the second edition of Mr. Pakistan, with Miss Joan Hunt and Miss Great Britain 1952 acting as judges. The third and fourth iterations of the competition were also held in Lahore.

Another event, Junior Mr. Pakistan, was introduced in 1956.

Affiliations 
The Federation is affiliated with: 
 International Federation of BodyBuilding and Fitness
 Asian Federation of Bodybuilding & Fitness  
 Pakistan Olympic Association
 Pakistan Sports Board

External links
 Official Website

References

Sports governing bodies in Pakistan
Bodybuilding organizations
Bodybuilding in Pakistan